The Le Méridien Taichung is a 22-storey hotel building located in Central District, Taichung City, Taiwan. It is the 17th tallest building in Taiwan and the third tallest building in the city of Taichung. The hotel closed due to a fire in 2005. It is set to reopen on October 30, 2022, following major renovations.

Location
It is located in the center of Taichung, right in front of the Taichung Train Station.

History
The hotel opened in 1999 as the Golden Plaza Hotel. On Saturday, 26 February 2005, at 16:00 (08:00 GMT) a fire broke out in an upper floor. Those people located below the fire in the building were able to escape, taking cover from falling glass. Nine people were trapped on the roof of the building, 300 feet in the air, and were rescued by helicopter. 4 people were killed and 3 more injured. The cause of the fire was found to be an accident by a construction crew. In 2013, the damaged structure was purchased by Royal Seasons Hotels, which began renovations. The hotel was intended to reopen as Le Méridien Taichung, managed by the Le Méridien division of Marriott Hotels. However, the reopening has been postponed due to the COVID-19 pandemic.

See also
 List of tallest buildings in Taiwan

References

1. Air rescue from Taiwan Tower fire.

External links
Le Méridien Taichung official website

1999 establishments in Taiwan
Buildings and structures in Taichung
Hotel buildings completed in 1999
Skyscraper hotels in Taichung